Nehrunagar Vidhan Sabha seat was one of the seats in Maharashtra Legislative Assembly in India. It was made defunct after constituency map of India was redrawn in 2008. Nehrunagar is a suburb of Mumbai, next to Kurla.

A trivia item about this constituency is that Babasaheb Bhosale, who represented it from 1980 to 1985, was the Chief Minister of the state for an year during his five-year stint as MLA.

Members of Vidhan Sabha

Election Results

1978 Assembly Election
 Liyaqat Husain Ibarat Husain (JNP) : 26,590 votes    
 Syed Suhail Asharaf (Muslim League) : 11,960

1980 Assembly Election
 Babasaheb Anantrao Bhosale (INC-I) : 21,276 votes    
 Eknath Ramchandra Koparde (JNP-JP) : 18165

2004 Assembly Election
 Nawab Malik (NCP) : 67,115 votes  
 Suryakant Mahadik (SHS) : 36854

See also 
 List of constituencies of Maharashtra Legislative Assembly

References 

Former assembly constituencies of Maharashtra